El César is a Mexican biographical television series that premiered on Space on 18 September 2017, and concluded on 11 December 2017. Based on the life of legendary Mexican's boxer Julio César Chávez. The series is produced by Disney Media Distribution Latin America, Televisión Azteca and BTF Media.  It stars Armando Hernández as the titular character.

Plot 
The series follows the life of Julio César Chávez (Armando Hernández). For 13 years, 11 months and 14 days, Julio remained undefeated at the height of popular fervor and had everything: family, fame, money full and legions of followers. However, as high is the summit as its fall lasts. Thus Julio acceded to a privileged world that led him to engage with dangerous drug gangs, to hold love affairs with famous TV stars, to rub shoulders with the highest spheres of Mexican political power, and to engage in a whirlwind of alcohol and drug addiction. drugs that would put an end to his career and, almost, to his life. Rehabilitated and active in the middle box.

Production 
On February 23, 2017 the start of production of the series was confirmed and officially concluded on May 29, 2017.

Cast 
 Armando Hernández as Julio César Chávez
 Marcela Guirado as Amalia Carrasco
 Leticia Huijara as Doña Isabel
 Maya Zapata as Blanca Santiago
 Julio Bracho as Ángel Gutiérrez
 Héctor Bonilla as Hombre del Cigarro
 Ivan Cortés as Zurdo Félix
 Adrian Makala as Mr. King
 Alejandra Toussaint as Maggie
 Sebastián Buitrón as Chuy
 Andrés Montiel as Salvador Ochoa
 Cecilia Suárez as Tía Hilda
 Álvaro Guerrero as José Sulaiman
 Gimena Gómez as Brisa Rafal
 Rosita Pelayo as Soledad Garduño
 Luis Fernando Peña as Macho Camacho
 Enoc Leaño as Rómulo
 María Aura as Sabina
 Alfonso Borbolla as Bruno Casados
 Gustavo Sánchez Parra as Rodolfo
 Luis Alberti as Maiko

Episodes

U.S. episodes

Ratings 
 

| link2             = #Season 2 (2018)
| episodes2         = 10 
| start2            = 
| end2              = 
| startrating2         = 0.57
| endrating2           = 0.48
| viewers2          = |2}} 
}}

Season 1 (2017)

Season 2 (2018)

U.S. special

Awards and nominations

References

External links 
 

2010s Mexican television series
CTV Sci-Fi Channel original programming
Mexican television series
2017 Mexican television series debuts
2017 Mexican television series endings
Spanish-language television shows